Christopher Stuart O'Loughlin (born December 13, 1967) is an American Olympic épée fencer.

Early life
O'Loughlin was born in Los Angeles, California. His father was actor Gerald S. O'Loughlin, known for the 1970s ABC television drama police procedural series The Rookies. His mother, Meryl Abeles O'Loughlin was vice president of casting for Columbia Pictures Television. He grew up in Van Nuys, California, and is Jewish.

While he initially had an interest in pursuing acting, O'Loughlin noted: "One of the things that I really like about fencing is that you get out of it what you put into it. That's not true with acting."

He was introduced to fencing as a youth when he attended the Oakwood School in North Hollywood, California, which offered fencing as a sport. In 1985, he became the youngest senior US Championship men's épée finalist until that time. He graduated from high school in 1985.

He enrolled in the University of Pennsylvania in 1986, graduating in 1989 with a degree in urban studies. There, he was a member of St. Anthony Hall and the Penn Quakers fencing team.

O'Loughlin earned a master's degree from Columbia University.

Fencing career
While a freshman member of the University of Pennsylvania Quakers fencing team, O'Loughlin won the National Collegiate Athletic Association (NCAA) Championship in épée in 1986. He was also a four-time All-American and All-Ivy League from 1986 to 1989. He also won the Intercollegiate Fencing Association (IFA) Eastern Championship in 1986. In 1986 he received Penn's Peter K. Riley Award, as the outstanding freshman athlete. He was captain of Penn's fencing team in his junior and senior seasons.

While attending the University of Pennsylvania he was the Junior US National Championship, serving on the Junior National Team in 1986 and 1987. O'Loughlin won a silver individual medal and a bronze team medal in épée at the 1989 Maccabiah Games. He was a member of the World University Games team in 1987, 1989, 1991, 1993, and 1995.

He served on the Senior World Championship Team in 1990, 1991, and 1995. He won a bronze medal with the United States épée team at the 1991 Pan American Games.

O'Loughlin competed on behalf of the United States in the individual épée event at the 1992 Summer Olympics in Barcelona and was the first alternate for the 1996 Summer Olympics in Atlanta. In 2000, O'Loughlin won the U.S. National Championship in individual épée.

In 2012, he began competing at the Veteran level. That year, he won the silver medal in the North American Cup–Veteran Level, also winning the silver medal in 2016. At the April 2017 North American Cup, he won the gold medal in the Veteran 50 to 59 category and won a silver medal in the Veteran Open category. In 2018, he placed ninth in the USA Fencing National Championships, veteran age 50 to 59 category. That same year, he helped team USA win a gold medal at the 2018 Veteran World Championships in Livorno, Italy. O'Loughlin said, “I’ve been fencing for a really long time,” O’Loughlin says. “I’ve won a lot of national tournaments and done well internationally. But I never had the luck or good fortune to stand on the podium while they play the national anthem and raise the American flag. I honestly did not think it would affect me. But I was touched. I was really, really touched.” He also places seventh overall at the Veteran World Championships. His coaches are Alex Abend & Jim Carpenter.

He is a member of the New York Athletic Club team, becoming national champions six times. He was chairman of the NYAC fencing. He was also the United States athlete representative to the Fencing Association.

Competitions

Honors 

 University of Pennsylvania Hall of Fame.
 Philadelphia Jewish Sports Hall of Fame, 2019.
NCAA All-American in1986, 1987, 1988, and 1989.

Professional and personal life 
In 1990, O'Loughlin worked with NYNEX, later Verizon, as part of the U.S.O.C. Olympic Job Opportunity Program. Since then, he has held several executive positions in the telecommunications infrastructure and software industry. He is currently vice-president of CENX.

O’Loughlin married Colleen Clinton. The couple originally lived in New York City, but now lives in Jersey City, New Jersey. They have one son.

He is a Little League Baseball coach.

See also
 List of USFA Division I National Champions

References

External links
 
 Chris O’Loughlin Memorabilia

1967 births
Living people
American male épée fencers
Olympic fencers of the United States
Fencers at the 1992 Summer Olympics
Sportspeople from Los Angeles
Pan American Games medalists in fencing
Pan American Games bronze medalists for the United States
Jewish male épée fencers
Jewish American sportspeople
Sportspeople from New York City
Maccabiah Games medalists in fencing
Maccabiah Games silver medalists for the United States
Maccabiah Games bronze medalists for the United States
Competitors at the 1989 Maccabiah Games
Fencers at the 1991 Pan American Games
University of Pennsylvania School of Arts and Sciences alumni
Columbia University alumni
Penn Quakers fencers
21st-century American Jews
Medalists at the 1991 Pan American Games